Urodacus novaehollandiae, also known as the coastal burrowing scorpion or black sand scorpion, is a species of scorpion in the Urodacidae family. It is endemic to Australia, and was first described in 1861 by German naturaliat Wilhelm Peters.

Description
The species grows to about 70–100 mm in length. Colouration is mainly yellowish-brown to dark brown, with the head and pincers darker.

Distribution and habitat
The species occurs along the coast of South Australia from Adelaide westwards, around the Great Australian Bight and south-west Western Australia, to Perth. It is found in coastal dunes as well as in sandy soils farther inland at the western end of its range.

Behaviour
The scorpions are nocturnal ambush predators. They dig spiral burrows up to 1 m deep where they shelter during the day. The are known to live until at least 12 years old.

References

 

 
novaehollandiae
Scorpions of Australia
Endemic fauna of Australia
Fauna of South Australia
Fauna of Western Australia
Animals described in 1861
Taxa named by Wilhelm Peters